Acantholipes transiens is a species of moth in the family Erebidae. It is found in Madagascar and Tanzania.

References

transiens
Moths described in 1956
Moths of Africa